William Horsfall may refer to:
 William H. Horsfall (1847–1922), American soldier and Medal of Honor recipient
 William R. Horsfall (1907–1998), American entomologist